During World War II, Operation Herbstreise (Autumn Journey in German) was a planned series of deception operations to support the German invasion of the United Kingdom (Operation Seelöwe). It would have involved an empty convoy of large transports threatening the east coast of England while the actual invasion force in small barges hit the southern coast.

Two days prior to the actual landings, the light cruisers Emden (Kapitän zur See Hans Mirow), Nürnberg (Kapitän zur See Leo Kreisch with Vizeadmiral Hubert Schmundt, the Commander of Cruisers, aboard) and Köln (Kapitän zur See Ernst Kratzenberg), the gunnery training ship Bremse and other light naval forces would escort the liners Europa, Bremen, Gneisenau and Potsdam, with 11 transport steamers, on Operation Herbstreise (Autumn Journey), a feint simulating a landing against the British east coast between Aberdeen and Newcastle. After turning about, the force would attempt the diversion again on the next day if necessary. (Most of the troops allocated to the diversion would actually board the ships, but disembark before the naval force sortied.)

Shortly before the commencement of "Sea Lion", the heavy cruiser Admiral Hipper (Kapitän zur See Wilhelm Meisel), on standby at Kiel from 13 September 1940, would carry out a diversionary sortie in the vicinity of Iceland and the Faroes.

The heavy cruiser Admiral Scheer (Kapitän zur See Theodor Krancke) would carry out another diversionary mission by raiding merchant shipping in the Atlantic. (It is doubtful this ship would have been available in time for the operation as she was undergoing extensive trials and crew training in the Baltic Sea following a major shipyard refit.)

References 

Abandoned projects of Nazi Germany
Amphibious operations of World War II
Cancelled invasions
Cancelled military operations involving Germany
Cancelled military operations of World War II
Germany–United Kingdom military relations
Invasions by Germany
Invasions of England
Western European theatre of World War II
World War II deception operations
World War II in the English Channel